Eduardo Óscar Soto Ortiz (born 20 February 1965) is a Chilean football manager and former footballer who played as a midfielder for clubs in Chile and abroad.

Playing career
Soto is a product of Universidad Católica youth system, where he coincided with players such as Carlos Soto, Luis Abarca and Mario Lepe.

Abroad, he played in Switzerland for FC Baden in the second level alongside his compatriots Claudio Álvarez and Ramón Pérez, América in Mexico, where he coincided with well-known players such as François Omam-Biyik and Luis García, and in the Guatemalan football.

Coaching career

He has worked as assistant coach in both Audax Italiano and O'Higgins. As a head coach, he has worked for Deportes Valdivia and Unión Molina in the third and the fifth level of the Chilean football, respectively.

Honours
Unión Española
 Primera B de Chile: 1999

References

External links
 
 
 Eduardo Soto at Resultados-Futbol.com 

1965 births
Living people
Footballers from Santiago
Chilean footballers
Chilean expatriate footballers
Club Deportivo Universidad Católica footballers
Everton de Viña del Mar footballers
Unión San Felipe footballers
Regional Atacama footballers
FC Baden players
Deportes La Serena footballers
O'Higgins F.C. footballers
Club América footballers
Club Deportivo Palestino footballers
Audax Italiano footballers
Unión Española footballers
Tercera División de Chile players
Primera B de Chile players
Chilean Primera División players
Swiss Challenge League players
Liga MX players
Chilean expatriate sportspeople in Switzerland
Chilean expatriate sportspeople in Mexico
Chilean expatriate sportspeople in Guatemala
Expatriate footballers in Switzerland
Expatriate footballers in Mexico
Expatriate footballers in Guatemala
Association football midfielders
Chilean football managers